Zloganje is a village just north of Škocjan in the traditional region of Lower Carniola in southeastern Slovenia. Within the Municipality of Škocjan, it belongs to the Local Community of Škocjan. The Municipality of Škocjan is included in the Southeast Slovenia Statistical Region. 

The local church is dedicated to the Visitation of Mary and belongs to the Parish of Škocjan. It is a medieval building that was restyled in the Baroque in the 18th century.

References

External links
Zloganje at Geopedia

Populated places in the Municipality of Škocjan